Cuapetes elegans is a shrimp species in the genus Cuapetes.

References

Palaemonoidea
Crustaceans described in 1875